Zimní stadion Opava is an indoor sporting arena located in Opava, Czech Republic. The capacity of the arena is 5,500 people. The arena was built in 1953 and roofed in 1956 as the third arena in Czechoslovakia. It is currently home to the HC Slezan Opava ice hockey team. It was partially reconstructed in 2003.

External links 
Information at the official website

Indoor ice hockey venues in the Czech Republic
Buildings and structures in Opava
Sports venues in the Moravian-Silesian Region
1956 establishments in Czechoslovakia
Sports venues completed in 1956
20th-century architecture in the Czech Republic